OBK is a Spanish synthpop music group from Barcelona (Spain) composed of Jordi Sánchez and Miguel Arjona. The group was famous for introducing the electronic music in Spain in the 1990s (in the early 1980s some Spanish synthpop bands as Azul y Negro and Aviador Dro, among others, had gained great success also).

Members 
 Jordi Sánchez from 1990 to present
 Miguel Arjona from 1990 to 2012

History

The OBK boom 
Jordi Sanchez and Miguel Arjona met for first time in the Athletism club of Sant Feilu de Llobregat. They were fans of groups like Yazoo, OMD and specially, Depeche Mode.
They debuted in the musical scene with Konga Music, an indie record label which supported all kinds of electronic music. In 1991, appeared their first release, a mini album called "Llámalo sueño..." (Call it a dream...). This album is the most successful of their career and sold over 400.000 copies in Spain. In fact, they entered in the history of the Spanish pop music for being the first group that had such sales with a debut album. Four singles were released from the album. The first one was "¿De que me sirve llorar?" (What can I do by crying?), "Oculta realidad" (Hidden truth), "La princesa de mis sueños" (The princess of my dreams), and the most famous hit: "Historias de amor" (Love stories), which is considered the icon song from the group.

Two years later, appeared their second album called "Momentos de fe" (Moments of faith), that was released with the label, Blanco y negro music. This time the album was highly promoted, but it didn't have the success of the first album. It sold over 130.000 copies. The singles extracted from the album were: "Dicen" (They say...), "Robarle al tiempo" (To steal from Time), "Lágrimas de soledad" (Loneliness tears) and "Todavía" (Still). The first single was very polemical because the tital song was directed to the musical critics who used to make very bad reviews about their music.

Decline in sales and popularity
The third album, called "Trilogía" (Trilogy), was released in 1995 and was the first album released with the Spanish branch of EMI, the same label in which they would release their next albums. Trilogía was famous for its first single : "Mi razón de ser" (My reason for being), the first single that became an instantaneous hit. The following singles were: "Nada soy sin ti" (I'm nothing without you), "Dulce final" (Sweet end), and "Otra canción de amor" (Another love song). In spite of being under promoted, the album was well received, but its success was only moderate: It sold 80.000 copies and was certified gold. This was much lower than expected, and was the start of a long bad relationship with their record label.

One year later they released their fourth album called "Donde el corazón nos lleve" (Where the heart may lead us). The title of the album was intended as an ultimatum to EMI in result of the bad relationship with this label. The sales of this album were a huge failure. In fact the album was not certified, which led to a quick decline of the popularity of the group.

In 1998 they released a compilation album "Singles 91/98". This retrospective album was a "goodbye" to their fans because EMI had completely lost confidence in them. The album contained four new songs: "En medio de nada" (In the middle of nothing), "Juicio interior" (Inner judgment), a cover of "De qué me sirve llorar?", and a remix of "Historias de amor". The unexpected and surprising success of this album (200.000 copies) was one of the reasons why the group regained popularity, and gave them the chance to stay with EMI.

Return to pre-eminence
In 2000, two years after the compilation album, they released their fifth studio album, called "ANTROPOP", the second best selling album of their career (300.000 copies sold in Spain and 800.000 in Latin America). This album was produced by Carlos Jean, one of the big names of the Spanish electronic music scene. This album had four singles: "Tu sigue así" (Keep on like that), whose music video won the Ondas award for the best promotional video. The second single "El cielo no entiende" (Heaven doesn't understand) was used as the main theme for Spain's cycling tour coverage. The remaining singles were: "Falsa moral" (False morality) and "Lo tengo que dejar" (I have to stop this).
Babylon, Feeling, Ultimatum, and 20BK are the albums which complete their discography. In June 2012 they released a new single called "Promises", which will be included in the new studio album of original material that will be released in 2013.

Discography

Albums

Singles
1991: De que me sirve llorar
1991: Oculta realidad
1992: Historias de amor
1992: La princesa de mis sueños
1993: Dicen!...
1993: Robarle al tiempo
1993: Lágrimas de soledad
1994: Todavía
1995: Mi razón de ser
1995: Nada soy sin ti
1995: Dulce final
1996: Otra canción de amor
1996: Si esto no es amor
1997: Un día gris
1998: A contrapié
1998: Historias de amor (ASAP mix)
2000: Tu sigue así...
2000: El cielo no entiende
2000: Falsa moral
2001: Lo tengo que dejar
2003: Lucifer
2003: Quiereme otra vez
2004: La herida
2005: Sin rencor
2005: A ras del suelo
2006: Yo no soy COOL♥
2008: Yo no me escondo
2008: Siempre tú 
2011: Oculta realidad '11 
2011: El cielo no entiende '11 
2011: Historias de amor '11 
2012: Promises Ft. Pierre N'Sue

External links
 Official website
 Polish fan website

Spanish musical groups
Synthpop groups